777 Tower (originally known as Citicorp Center and also known as Pelli Tower) is a , 52-story high-rise office building designed by César Pelli located at 777 South Figueroa Street in the Financial District of Downtown Los Angeles, California.

Developed in 1991 by South Figueroa Plaza Associates as Citicorp Plaza, the building spans approximately 1,025,000 sq ft (95,200 m2) and has a three-story Italian marble lobby. The exterior is clad with sculpted white metal and glass. The tower is adjacent to the FIGat7th shopping center, which opened in 1986 as "Seventh Market Place" and had two department stores: Bullock's and May Co. It was purchased from Maguire Properties by owner Brookfield Properties.

A shot of the tower under construction can be seen looking from 12th street in the 1989 comedy Police Academy 6: City Under Siege. It also plays a role in the finale to the 2001 film Swordfish, where a Skyhook helicopter deposits a bus full of hostages on the helipad.

Tenants

 American International Group
 Arnold & Porter
 Brown & Riding Insurance Services
 RBC Capital Markets
 Zurich

Awards

1993 LA Business Council Best High Rise Commercial Bldg
 1994 LA Business Council Beautification Award
 1996 Building Owners and Managers Association Building of the Year Award

Gallery

References

External links
777 Tower official website
Jones & Jones Construction

Buildings and structures in Downtown Los Angeles
Skyscraper office buildings in Los Angeles
Office buildings completed in 1991
1991 establishments in California
1990s architecture in the United States
Brookfield Properties buildings
César Pelli buildings
Citigroup buildings
Leadership in Energy and Environmental Design gold certified buildings
Financial District, Los Angeles